Christopher Dennis Dingell (born February 23, 1957) is an American former politician and current judge.

Biography
From Trenton, Michigan, Dingell studied materials and metallurgical engineering at the University of Michigan. He then received his bachelor's degree from University of Michigan in 1978 and his J.D. degree from Detroit College of Law in 1986. He served in the Michigan State Senate from 1987 to 2003 and was a Democrat. A third-generation politician, his grandfather John Dingell Sr., father John Dingell Jr., and stepmother Debbie Dingell have successively represented suburban Detroit in the United States House of Representatives since 1932. Dingell then began working as a Michigan Circuit Court judge, now as member of 3rd Circuit for Wayne County.

Notes

1957 births
Living people
20th-century American politicians
21st-century American politicians
People from Trenton, Michigan
Politicians from Washington, D.C.
Lawyers from Washington, D.C.
Michigan State University College of Law alumni
University of Michigan College of Engineering alumni
Michigan state court judges
Democratic Party Michigan state senators
Christopher